The City Assembly of Niš is the legislature of the City of Niš, third largest city in Serbia. It is a representative body that executes the essential functions of the local government stipulated by the legislation and the City Charter.

Composition 
The City Assembly consists of 61 councilors elected at the local election for the four years’ term. The City Assembly gets together according to circumstances, and at least once in three months.

Leadership

President 
The President of the City Assembly organizes the work of the City Assembly, summons sessions, suggests the agenda and presides over the City Assembly sessions, looks after implementing of the transparency of work of the City Assembly, signs bylaws adopted by the City Assembly and performs any other operations entrusted by the City Assembly. The City Assembly elects the President and Deputy President from the complement of the councilors for the four years’ term.

The current President of the City Assembly is Rade Rajković, while Mile Ilić is the Deputy President of the City Assembly.

Secretary 
The Secretary of the City Assembly looks after the performance of professional operations in connection with convening and holding of sessions of the City Assembly and its working bodies, and manages administrative affairs related to their work. The City Assembly appoints the Secretary and Deputy Secretary of the City Assembly at the proposal of the President of the City Assembly, for four years.

The current Secretary of the City Assembly is Ružica Đorđević, while Milena Kostić is the Deputy Secretary of the City Assembly.

Authorities 
City Assembly decides about:

 Adoption of the City Charter and deciding on its amendments;
 Adopting of the City budget and annual financial report;
 Certain activities, as well as programs for acquiring and alienating real estate;
 Symbols, holidays and other features of the City;
 Changing street names;
 The public debt of the City;
 Calling for referendum;
 Cooperation and association with other units of local self-government and on cooperation  with local government units in other countries;
 Adoption the ethical code of conduct of officials;
 The election and dismissal of the President and the Deputy Chairman of the Assembly;
 The election and dismissal of the Mayor and Deputy Mayor;
 The election and dismissal of the members of the City Council;
 The dissolution of the Municipal Assembly.

References 

Niš
Nišava District